The 2015–16 North Carolina Tar Heels women's basketball team will represent the University of North Carolina at Chapel Hill during the 2015–16 NCAA Division I women's basketball season. The Tar Heels, led by thirtieth year head coach Sylvia Hatchell, play their games at Carmichael Arena and were members of the Atlantic Coast Conference. They finished the season 14–18, 4–12 in ACC play to finish in a tie for twelfth place. They lost in the first round of the ACC women's tournament to Pittsburgh.

Roster

Schedule

|-
!colspan=9 style="background:#56A0D3; color:#FFFFFF;"|Exhibition

|-
!colspan=9 style="background:#56A0D3; color:#FFFFFF;"| Non-conference regular season

|-
!colspan=9 style="background:#56A0D3; color:#FFFFFF;"| ACC regular season

|-
!colspan=9 style="background:#56A0D3;"| ACC Women's Tournament

Source

Rankings

See also
2015–16 North Carolina Tar Heels men's basketball team

References

North Carolina Tar Heels women's basketball seasons
North Carolina
North Car
North Car